Constantine Alexander (born 8 April 1950) is a British judoka. He competed in the men's lightweight event at the 1976 Summer Olympics.

References

External links

1950 births
Living people
British male judoka
Olympic judoka of Great Britain
Judoka at the 1976 Summer Olympics
Place of birth missing (living people)